China National Highway 223 runs from Haikou in Hainan to Sanya, Hainan. It is 323 kilometres in length. It is the eastern part of Hainan Ring Highway.

Route and distance

See also 

 China National Highways

Transport in Hainan
223